Chester Harding Jr. was an American military officer that participated in the American Civil War who was most notable for commanding the 43rd Missouri Infantry Regiment at the Battle of Glasgow, Missouri.

Biography
Junior was born in October 16, 1827 in Northampton, Massachusetts as the son of Chester Harding Sr. Harding entered military service upon the outbreak of the American Civil War, initially as a Lieutenant Colonel and Assistant Adjutant General on the staff of Brig. General Nathaniel Lyon and commanded the 10th Missouri and 25th Missouri infantry regiments.

He later commanded the 43rd Missouri Infantry Regiment as part of the defense of Missouri during Price's Missouri Expedition. Harding confronted the Confederates at the Battle of Glasgow, Missouri, which ended in defeat for the Union. When the war concluded, Harding was brevetted to Brigadier General for "faithful and meritorious services during the war" and replaced Brigadier General John McNeil as commander of the District of Central Missouri. He was mustered out in June 1865. Harding died in St. Louis on February 10, 1875, and was interred there in the Jefferson Barracks National Cemetery.

See also
List of American Civil War brevet generals (Union)

References

1827 births
1875 deaths
Harvard Law School alumni
People from Northampton, Massachusetts
Union Army colonels
Military personnel from Massachusetts
People of Missouri in the American Civil War